Hohenau an der March is a town in the district of Gänserndorf in the Austrian state of Lower Austria, close to Vienna and the borders with the Czech Republic and Slovakia.

Geography
The town lies on the river Morava (March in German). It lies in the Weinviertel in Lower Austria. Only about 6.18 percent of the municipality is forested.

Climate

References

External links

Cities and towns in Gänserndorf District